Chenari (also Romanized as Chenārī) is a village in Garin Rural District, Zarrin Dasht District, Nahavand County, Hamadan Province, Iran. At the 2006 census, its population was 574, in 146 families.

References 

Populated places in Nahavand County